"Calling All Angels" is the fourth single produced, written, arranged and performed by Lenny Kravitz from his album Baptism, released on 2004.

Live performances
In 2023, Kravitz performed the song for the "In Memoriam" segment at the 95th Academy Awards.

Chart performance
Following the surge in popularity in 2023, "Calling All Angels" charted at number 79 on the UK's Singles Downloads Chart on 17 March 2023.

Charts

Certifications

References

2004 songs
Lenny Kravitz songs
Songs written by Lenny Kravitz